Francis William FitzHardinge Berkeley, 2nd Baron FitzHardinge FSA (16 November 1826 – 28 June 1896), was a British Liberal Party politician.

Background and education
FitzHardinge was the eldest son of Admiral Maurice Berkeley, 1st Baron FitzHardinge, and Lady Charlotte, daughter of Charles Lennox, 4th Duke of Richmond. He was educated at Rugby.

Career
In early adulthood he served as a captain in the Royal Horse Guards. Later he was appointed Honorary Colonel of the Royal South Gloucestershire Light Infantry Militia on 22 December 1857 in succession his uncle William Berkeley, 1st Earl FitzHardinge. In the 1860s Col Berkeley took over as Lieutenant-Colonel Commandant of the regiment, reverting to hon col on 26 May 1868. He sat as the Member of Parliament (MP) for Cheltenham between 1856 and 1865. Two years later he succeeded his father in the barony and was enabled to take a seat in the House of Lords. He was also a Fellow of the Society of Antiquaries.

Family
Lord FitzHardinge married Georgina, daughter of William Holme-Sumner, in 1857. The marriage was childless. He died in London in June 1896, aged 69, and was succeeded in the peerage by his younger brother, Charles. Lady FitzHardinge died in July 1897, aged 66.

References

External links 
 

1826 births
1896 deaths
Gloucestershire Militia officers
Barons in the Peerage of the United Kingdom
Berkeley, Francis
Berkeley, Francis
Berkeley, Francis
Berkeley, Francis
FitzHardinge, B2
Fellows of the Society of Antiquaries of London
Francis
Presidents of the Marylebone Cricket Club
Politics of Cheltenham